NCAA Independents may refer to:

NCAA Division I FBS independent schools
NCAA Division I FCS independent schools
NCAA Division I independent schools — in general
NCAA Division I independent schools (ice hockey)
NCAA Division II independent schools
NCAA Division III independent schools
NCAA independent schools (lacrosse) – all divisions